The Louisiana was a steamboat that sank in Lake Michigan off the coast of Washington, Door County, Wisconsin, United States, during the Great Lakes Storm of 1913. In 1992 the shipwreck site was added to the National Register of Historic Places.

History
The Louisiana was constructed in Marine City, Michigan in 1887, while her engine was built at the Dry Dock Complex in Detroit, Michigan.

On November 2, 1913, the Louisiana departed from Lorain, Ohio to deliver a load of coal to Milwaukee, Wisconsin. After completing her stop in Milwaukee, the Louisiana made way for Escanaba, Michigan to pick up a load of iron ore. In the early morning hours of November 8, the ship passed through Porte des Morts. Upon reaching the strait, she was greeted by a severe snowstorm. The captain attempted to take refuge at Washington Island in Door County, Wisconsin, but the heavy seas and howling wind proved too strong for the ship's anchors to hold her in place, and she was run aground.

Despite the situation on board the Louisiana, the crew opted to remain aboard the vessel rather than taking the one small lifeboat they had out to the raging seas. However, a fire broke out in the cargo hold later in the morning and the crew members were left with no choice. A rescue ship had been deployed from Plum Island, but the breaking waves were too powerful for the ship to be able to reach the crew. In the end, the crew was able to make it to shore.

The ship's boiler, engine, propeller, propeller shaft and rudder were later salvaged. Currently, the site is a popular area for divers and archaeologists.

References

1887 ships
Door County, Wisconsin
Maritime incidents in 1913
Shipwrecks of Lake Michigan
Shipwrecks of the Wisconsin coast
Shipwrecks on the National Register of Historic Places in Wisconsin
National Register of Historic Places in Door County, Wisconsin
Ships sunk with no fatalities
Great Lakes freighters
Ships built in Marine City, Michigan